C. Marcella Carollo worked as a professional astronomer for 25 years between 1994 and 2019. Her scientific career was ended by the ETH Zürich who, following accusations that she had bullied students, made her the first Professor to be dismissed at ETH Zurich in the 165 years of its history. Carollo has maintained her innocence against these accusations, publicly commenting on her case in terms that indicate "academic mobbing". The dismissal was appealed unsuccessfully to the Swiss Federal Administrative Court.

The case has attracted considerable controversy. It has become a prime exhibit in the debate about due process and the preservation of basic legal rights within academia, especially in German-speaking universities.

Education 
Carollo began her studies at the University of Palermo where she earned a laurea degree in physics in 1987, with a specialization in biophysics. She worked for more than four years outside of academia before starting a PhD in astrophysics at Ludwig Maximilian University of Munich, where she graduated in 1994.

Career 
Carollo was awarded a European Community Prize Fellowship, which she held at Leiden University from 1994 to 1996. She held a Hubble Postdoctoral Fellowship at Johns Hopkins University from 1997 to 1999. Carollo was appointed Assistant Professor in the Astronomy Department at Columbia University in 1999, a position she held until 2002. That year, she moved to ETH Zurich as an Associate Professor, in a dual appointment with her spouse Simon Lilly. She was promoted to Full Professor in 2007. She contributed as a member of the Science Oversight Committee to the development of the WFC3 camera which was installed on the Hubble Space Telescope in 2009. In 2012, she entered the Top Italian Scientist list from VIA Academy and in 2013 she was awarded the Winton Capital Research Prize. In 2018, she was identified as a Highly Cited Researcher  for her research work at ETH between 2006 and 2016 – one of only about 20 ETH scientists so recognized.

Research 
Carollo's contribution to astronomy is in the fields of extragalactic astronomy and specifically galaxy formation and evolution. Her early work established the relation between the metallicity gradient and stellar mass in galactic spheroids, demonstrated the presence of dark matter halos beyond their half-light radii and was seminal in discovering and characterizing disk-like (pseudo) bulges and nuclear massive star clusters in disk galaxies like the Milky Way. Later she and her ETH group worked on the role of galactic environment and progenitor bias in galaxy evolution, the growth and "quenching" of massive galaxies at high redshifts, and participated in the discovery and characterization of the most distant galaxies in the universe, in the heart of the reionization epoch.

Controversy 

In December 2016, Professor Carollo informed one of her PhD students that she could no longer supervise her PhD, because of the lack of progress. The PHD student reached out to ETH Ombusdman Wilfred van Gunsteren, complaining that she was insufficiently supervised and had been bullied by Professor Carollo. In January 2017, the ETH Ombudsman as well as the student collected complaints (testimonials) about Carollo from a number of previous students and postdocs.

In May 2017, ETH Zurich decided to dissolve its Institute for Astronomy. Marcella Carollo and her spouse Simon Lilly, until the dissolution the head of that Institute, were given a sabbatical leave. In October 2017, an article about the closure and the allegations against Carollo appeared in a Swiss newspaper and was also reported internationally.

Shortly afterwards, the ETH Zurich commissioned an Administrative Investigation from an external lawyer, Dr. Markus Rüssli, of the Zurich law firm Umbricht. His report was delivered to ETH in October 2018.

Meanwhile, on 17 January 2018, the ETH Zurich announced a second investigation against Carollo. This concerned accusations of scientific misconduct in the same testimonials. The ETH at this time suspended Carollo from her duties at the university.

In the meantime, in October 2018 the ETH announced, on the basis of the Rüssli Report, that they had started the formal procedure to determine whether Carollo should be dismissed from her position as a professor. The Dismissal Commission that it established for this purpose made a clear recommendation that "Professor Carollo should not be dismissed". The report of the Commission noted a "lack of objectivity" in the Rüssli report and "regards it as overwhelmingly probable that any Court would consider the dismissal of Professor Carollo to be unjustified (or at best against the law)".

In March 2019 the President of ETH Zurich submitted a request to the ETH Board to terminate the employment relationship with Professor Carollo. On July 15, 2019, the ETH Board agreed to this request and dismissed Carollo with six months notice.

The dismissal was appealed unsuccessfully to the Swiss Federal Administrative Court.

Following the affair, a June 2019 independent audit by the Swiss Federal Audit Office criticized the general setup of the Ombudsman office at the ETH, recommending a more independent office, with fewer current or former members of the ETH or other members with longstanding ties.

The Carollo case has been widely covered in the German-language Swiss media. The Swiss online magazine Republik  criticized the ETH Zürich's handling of the case in a series of articles.

References 

21st-century Italian astronomers
20th-century Swiss astronomers
Hubble Fellows
Women astronomers
1962 births
Living people
Academic staff of ETH Zurich
Italian women scientists
Swiss women scientists
Scientists from Palermo
20th-century Italian astronomers
21st-century Swiss astronomers
20th-century women scientists
21st-century women scientists